The 2001 Stan James British Open was a professional ranking snooker tournament, that was held from 29 September–7 October 2001 at the Telewest Arena, Newcastle-upon-Tyne, England.
 
John Higgins won the tournament by defeating Graeme Dott nine frames to six in the final. The defending champion, Peter Ebdon, was defeated by Mark King in the quarter-final.


Main draw

Final

References

British Open (snooker)
British Open
Open (snooker)